Ethmia linda is a moth in the family Depressariidae. It is found from Venezuela to southern Mexico (eastern Oaxaca, Veracruz and Yucatán).

The ground color of the forewings is white, faintly tinged with grayish on the costal half. The ground color of the hindwings is brown, usually dark at least distally. Adults are on wing in March (in Yucatán), in July (in Veracruz and Oaxaca), in August and October (in Guatemala) and in November (in Venezuela).

References

Moths described in 1914
linda